Thiagarajar College of Engineering (TCE) is a Government-aided institution located in Thiruparankundram, Madurai, Tamil Nadu, India. It is affiliated to Anna University, Madurai.

History
Thiagarajar College of Engineering is one of several educational institutions founded by philanthropist and industrialist Karumuttu Thiagarajan Chettiar. TCE was established in 1957 under the University of Madras. The courses offered in TCE are approved by the All India Council for Technical Education, New Delhi. TCE was granted autonomy in the year 1987.

Location

The institution and hostels are located near Thirupparankundram on the outskirts of Madurai, 8 kilometres south-west of the city of Madurai.

The campus is located 10 km from the Madurai Airport, 8 km from the Madurai Railway station and 2 km from Thirupparankundram railway station and is well connected by buses with all parts of state.

Academic programs

TCE offers 9 undergraduate, 9 postgraduate programs and research programs (MS and PhD) in all Engineering and Science streams.

Ranking

TCE was ranked 85 among engineering colleges in India by the National Institutional Ranking Framework (NIRF) in 2022 and 151–200 band overall.

Notable alumni

 A. Sivathanu Pillai, Honorary Distinguished Professor at ISRO
 Karthik Subbaraj, Kollywood director
 Nambi Narayanan, S. Nambi Narayanan is an Indian scientist. As a senior official at the Indian Space Research Organisation, he was in-charge of the cryogenics division.

References

External links
 

All India Council for Technical Education
Engineering colleges in Tamil Nadu
Engineering colleges in Madurai
Colleges affiliated to Anna University
Colleges in Madurai
Universities and colleges in Madurai
Science and technology in Madurai
Educational institutions established in 1957
1957 establishments in Madras State
Academic institutions formerly affiliated with the University of Madras